In mathematics, Watson's lemma, proved by G. N. Watson (1918, p. 133), has significant application within the theory on the asymptotic behavior of integrals.

Statement of the lemma 

Let  be fixed.

Suppose, in addition, either that 

Then, it is true that for all positive  that

 

and that the following asymptotic equivalence holds:

Proof 

The basic idea behind the proof is that we will approximate  by finitely many terms of its Taylor series. At each step we will carefully estimate how much we are throwing away or adding on.

We can show that the integral is finite for  large enough by writing

and estimating each term.

For the first term we have

We can deduce from the above calculation that

By appealing to Taylor's theorem with remainder we know that, for each integer ,

Plugging this in to the first term in  we get

To bound the term involving the remainder we use the assumption that  is continuous on the interval , and in particular it is bounded there.  As such we see that

Here we have used the fact that

From the above calculation we see from  that

For each  we have

and we will show that the remaining integrals are exponentially small.  Indeed, if we make the change of variables  we get

If we substitute this last result into  we find that

Finally, substituting this into  we conclude that

Since this last expression is true for each integer  we have thus shown that

Example 
When , the confluent hypergeometric function of the first kind has the integral representation

where  is the gamma function.  The change of variables  puts this into the form

which is now amenable to the use of Watson's lemma.

which allows us to conclude that

References 
.
.
 Ablowitz, M. J., Fokas, A. S. (2003). Complex variables: introduction and applications. Cambridge University Press.
Lemmas in analysis
Asymptotic analysis
Theorems in real analysis
Theorems in complex analysis